Acanthocyclops hypogeus is a species of copepod in the family Cyclopidae. It is endemic to Slovenia.

References

Cyclopidae
Freshwater crustaceans of Europe
Crustaceans described in 1930
Endemic fauna of Slovenia
Taxonomy articles created by Polbot